Haileybury Almaty is an independent school in Almaty, Kazakhstan. It as an offshoot of Haileybury, a distinguished English public school. In September 2008 Haileybury Almaty was officially opened by the Mayor of Almaty and Kazakhstan government education officials. It was the first British public school in Central Asia.

Curriculum 
Haileybury Almaty teaches pupils from 5–18 years of age and follows the British National Curriculum, which is adapted for local context. Every pupil at Haileybury schools in Kazakhstan is assigned to one of four Houses within the school: Attlee, Bartle Frere, Edmonstone or Kipling.

The school library has a collection of over 10,000 books and DVDs in English, Russian, and Kazakh.

References

External links 
 BBC News: UK public school for Kazakhstan 
 Architects Journal shortlist Building of the Year 2009

International schools in Kazakhstan
Education in Almaty
Educational institutions established in 1939
Educational institutions established in 2008
2008 establishments in Kazakhstan
Schools in Kazakhstan